Dakshineswar metro station is the northern terminal station of the Kolkata Metro Line 1. The metro station adjoins the platforms of the Dakshineswar railway station where connections can be made with Indian Railways services.

History 

A northward extension from Dum Dum to Dakshineswar (6.20 km [3.85 mi]) was sanctioned and included in the 2010–11 budget at a cost of ₹227.53 crore (equivalent to ₹411 crore or US$58 million in 2019). Construction for the station and the section started in 2017. In December 2017, the metro line to the Dakshineswar station was projected to be operational by May 2019.  By June 2019, over 95 percent of the viaduct had been completed for the between Noapara and Dakshineswar and that work had begun on the signaling system and laying of the tracks. Trial runs for this stretch started on 23 December 2020, after delay due to COVID-19 pandemic. The station was inaugurated on 22 February 2021 by Prime Minister Narendra Modi.

Location 

The station is located in Dakshineswar, North 24 Parganas, on PWD Road (Sitaramdas Omkarnath Sarani) and Ramakrishna Paramahansa Deb Road Crossing. The Station is situated around 300 metres away towards East from Bhabatarini Kali Temple.

The station

Layout

Connections

Rail 
It is directly connected with Dakshineswar railway station, a station on Calcutta chord link.

Ferry 
The station is connected to ferry also through Ma Bhabatarini Jetty Ghat, which is around 350 metres away from the station. Ferry routes towards Uttarpara, Belur Math, Bagbazar, Howrah, Shipping Corporation Ghat (near Millennium Park) and Chandpal Ghat are available.

See also
List of Kolkata Metro stations

References 

Kolkata Metro stations
Railway stations in North 24 Parganas district
Railway stations in India opened in 2021